Kenneth Traill (7 September 1926 – 25 March 2002) was an English professional rugby league footballer who played in the 1940s and 1950s, and coached in the 1950s, 1960s and 1970s.

Background
Traill was born in West Wylam, Northumberland, England, he was the son of the former Hunslet and Keighley rugby league footballer; Jim Traill. Traill attended Hunslet Carr School, he and his wife Joan were the landlord and lady of the Prospect Inn, 93 Moor Road, Hunslet, Leeds, and he died aged 75 in Guiseley, West Yorkshire, England.

Playing career
Traill made his debut for Hunslet against Oldham at Parkside, Hunslet on Saturday 26 February 1944. His career at Hunslet was interrupted by RAF national service.

Bradford Northern
He joined Bradford Northern in May 1947, making his début against Wakefield Trinity.

Traill played  in Bradford Northern's 3–8 defeat by Wigan in the 1947–48 Challenge Cup Final during 1947–48 season at Wembley Stadium, London on Saturday 1 May 1948, in front of a crowd of 91,465, and played in the 12–0 victory over Halifax in the 1948–49 Challenge Cup Final during the 1948–49 season on Saturday 7 May 1949, in front of a crowd of 95,050. He was first selected for England in 1949, playing against France.

He also played in Bradford Northern's 11–4 victory over Huddersfield in the 1949–50 Yorkshire Cup Final during the 1949–50 season at Headingley Rugby Stadium, Leeds on Saturday 29 October 1949.

He was selected for Yorkshire in 1950, however officials withdrew him from the side when they learned he was born in Northumberland, England. He was selected to represent Great Britain in 1950, playing in two matches against New Zealand, and in 1951, again against New Zealand.

Traill played  in Bradford Northern's 6–13 defeat by Wigan in the Rugby Football League Championship Final during the 1951–52 season at Leeds Road, Huddersfield on Saturday 10 May 1952. He played in three matches for Great Britain in 1952, against Australia.

Traill was again selected for England in 1953, playing against Wales and Other Nationalities, and again in 1955, playing against Other Nationalities. In 1954 he played for Great Britain against both New Zealand and Australia. He also played in one game against France for Great Britain.

He left Bradford Northern having played 315 matches for the Bradford Northern in ten seasons, scoring 37 tries and kicking three goals.

Halifax
He joined Halifax for the 1955-56 season. His last match was against Wakefield Trinity.

Wakefield Trinity
In 1957 Triall moved again, joining Wakefield Trinity. He was appointed as the player-coach the following year.

He was selected for Yorkshire County XIII during the 1958-59 season. That year he was the player-coach during Wakefield Trinity's 20–24 defeat by Leeds in the 1958–59 Yorkshire Cup Final during the 1958–59 season at Odsal Stadium, Bradford on Saturday 18 October 1958.

Coaching career
After retiring as a player, Traill continued to coach Wakefield Trinity.

Wakefield Trinity defeated Hull F.C. 38–5 in the 1959–60 Challenge Cup Final during the 1959–60 season at Wembley Stadium, London on Saturday 14 May 1960, in front of a crowd of 79,773. The following week, on 21 May, the team lost the Championship final to Wigan 3-27.

He was coach in the 16–10 victory over Huddersfield in the 1960–61 Yorkshire Cup Final during the 1960–61 season at Headingley Rugby Stadium, Leeds on Saturday 29 October 1960.

He also coached Wakefield Trinity in the 19–9 victory over Leeds in the 1961–62 Yorkshire Cup Final during the 1961–62 season at Odsal Stadium, Bradford on Saturday 11 November 1961. Later that season, he was the coach during the 12–6 victory over Huddersfield in the 1961–62 Challenge Cup final at Wembley Stadium, London on Saturday 12 May 1962, in front of a crowd of 81,263. The following week they played Huddersfield again, this time losing 5-14 in the 1961–62 season championship final at Odsal Stadium, Bradford on Saturday 19 May 1962.

He was the coach in the 25–10 victory over Wigan in the 1962–63 Challenge Cup Final during the 1962–63 season at Wembley Stadium, London on Saturday 11 May 1963, in front of a crowd of 84,492.

He was coach in the 18–2 victory over Leeds in the 1964–65 Yorkshire Cup Final during the 1964–65 season at Fartown Ground, Huddersfield on Saturday 31 October 1964.

He was the coach in the 21-9 victory over St. Helens in the Championship final replay during the 1966–67 season at Station Road, Swinton on Wednesday 10 May 1967.

Traill coached Wakefield Trinity to a 17-10 victory over Hull Kingston Rovers in the Championship final during the 1967–68 season at Headingley Rugby Stadium, Leeds on Saturday 4 May 1968. The following week, he was the coach in the 10-11 defeat by Leeds in the 1967–68 Challenge Cup  "Watersplash" final at Wembley Stadium, London on Saturday 11 May 1968, in front of a crowd of 87,100.

He retired in 1970. During this time, Wakefield Trinity had also won the RFL Yorkshire League in 1958-59, 1959–60, 1961–62 and 1962-63.

Honours
In August 2007 he was named Bradford Northern's Team of the Century.

References

External links
U.K. League Hooker in Doubt

(archived by web.archive.org) Bulls Mourn Ken Traill
(archived by web.archive.org) The Millennium Masters – Substitutes
(archived by web.archive.org) Wildcats History
(archived by web.archive.org) Team Of The Century
(archived by archive.is) When League was the new TV game
 ĎŔƑ Former Halifax Loose-Forward Traill Dies
 ĎŔƑ Ken Traill's Obituary In The Independent
Photograph "Northern at Fartown - The Northern side that took on Huddersfield in 1948. Bradford won 7-2 at Fartown. - Date: 30/03/1948" at rlhp.co.uk
Photograph "Action from the 1952 Championship final - More action from the 1952 Championship Final. - Date: 10/05/1952" at rlhp.co.uk
Photograph "Bradford Northern after winning the Yorkshire Cup - Trevor Foster with the Cup Winning side. Trevor holds the cup and is flanked by Ken Traill and Bob Jenkins - Date: 31/10/1953" at rlhp.co.uk
Rugby League Cup Final 1960
Wakefield Win Cup 1962
Rugby League Final 1963
Rugby Cup Final 1968

1926 births
2002 deaths
Bradford Bulls players
England national rugby league team players
English rugby league coaches
English rugby league players
Great Britain national rugby league team players
Halifax R.L.F.C. players
Hunslet F.C. (1883) players
People from Wylam
Rugby league locks
Rugby league players from Northumberland
Wakefield Trinity coaches
Wakefield Trinity players
Yorkshire rugby league team players
Royal Air Force personnel of World War II